The Barreteros de Zacatecas was a  Mexican professional basketball team based in Zacatecas, Zacatecas, Mexico playing in the Southern Division of the Liga Nacional de Baloncesto Profesional (LNBP).

History 
Barreteros were founded in the semi-pro league Liga Nacional de Clubes
achieving two championships in 2001 and 2003, in 2004 they startex playing in LNBP taking the place of Chihuahua Dorados. .

The first season of Barreteros in pro basketball was also their best, as they eliminated Algodoneros de la Comarca in the first round of playoffs. However. Fuerza Regia swept Zacatecas in four games in the semifinals. In 2005 Zacatecas was eliminated by the heavily favoured and eventual champions Halcones UV Xalapa in three games on the first round of playoffs.

2006 marked their first elimination in regular season, with a record of 10-26.

In 2007 the team merged with state rivals Gambusinos de Fresnillo to turn into Union Zacatecas and played half of their home games in Fresnillo. The slump continued and the team finished with a 20-28 record. In 2009 Barreteros makes the playoffs but was eliminated by regional rivals Panteras Aguascalientes.

In 2010, it was announced that the team would not take part in that year's season, causing great discontent among fans and leaving the state without a professional sports franchise for the first time in more than a decade.

In 2011, they made a comeback, but the franchise was shut down again prior to the 2013-14 season, reappearing in 2014 for only a year, and again in 2016.

In 2017, the Zacatecas State Government acquired the team and renamed it Mineros.

Coaches 
2004-06
 Jeff Moore
2007-10
 Alejandro Rivera
2011-...
Andres Contreras

2011 roster 
  Chaz Twan Briggs
  Ramiro Almanza Loera
  Salvador Cuevas
  Pablo González
  Forrest Ray Fisher III
  James Lamont Reaves
  Alejandro Aguirre
  Ángel Javier Chacón
  Fernando Sandoval
  Melvin Council
  Raúl Navarro López

See also 
Tuzos UAZ Cemozac

References

External links 
 Latin Basket info

Basketball teams in Mexico
Basketball teams established in 2004
2004 establishments in Mexico
Zacatecas City
Sport in Zacatecas